Paul Woods may refer to:
 Paul Woods (ice hockey)
 Paul Woods (rugby)
 Paul Woods (speedway rider)

See also
 Paul Wood (disambiguation)